Cornrows (sometimes called canerows) are a traditional style of  braids in which the hair is braided very close to the scalp, using an underhand, upward motion to make a continuous, raised row. Cornrows are often done in simple, straight lines, as the term implies, but they can also be styled in elaborate geometric or curvilinear designs.

Depending on the region of the world, cornrows are worn by both sexes, and are, on some occasions, adorned with beads, hair cuffs, or cowrie shells. The duration of weaving cornrow braids can take may up to five hours, depending on the quantity and width. Often favored for their easy maintenance, cornrows can be left in for weeks at a time if maintained through careful washing of the hair and natural oiling of the scalp. Braids are considered a protective styling on African curly hair as they allow for easy and restorative growth. Braids pulled too tightly or worn for longer lengths of time and on different hair types can cause a type of hair loss known as traction alopecia.

History 

The oldest known depictions of hairstyles that appear to be cornrows or braids are the statues known as the Venus of Brassempouy and the Venus of Willendorf, which date to 25,000-30,000 years ago and were found in modern day France and Austria.

Depictions of women with cornrows have been found in Stone Age paintings in the Tassili Plateau of the Sahara, and have been dated as far back as 3000 B.C. As well as the cornrow style is seen in depictions of ancient Cushitic people of the horn of Africa wearing this style of braids as far back as 2000 B.C. The traditional hairstyle of Roman Vestal Virgins incorporated cornrows.

The tradition of female hairstyling in cornrows has remained popular throughout Africa, particularly in the Horn of Africa and West Africa and the rest of Africa as a whole. Historically, male hairstyling with cornrows can be traced as far back as the early 5th century BC within Ancient Greek sculpture and artwork, typically shown on warriors and heroes. Artwork and statues of different Middle Eastern and Mediterranean civilisations dating back to the 3rd and 4th century BC also suggest that such hairstyles were common amongst warrior cultures. More modern male depictions occur in the 19th century Ethiopia, where warriors and kings such as Tewodros II and Yohannes IV were depicted wearing cornrows.

The name also refers to either the corn fields or sugar cane fields in the Caribbean. It is most commonly held that this idea originated from Benkos Biohó during his time as a slave in Colombia.

Cornrow hairstyles in Africa also cover a wide social terrain: religion, kinship, status, age, racial diversity, and other attributes of identity can all be expressed in hairstyle. Just as important is the act of braiding, which passes on cultural values between generations, expresses bonds between friends, and establishes the role of professional practitioner.

Cornrows have made a comeback in the United States in the 1960s and 1970s, and returned again during the 1990s and 2000s. In the 2000s, some athletes wore cornrows, including NBA basketball players Allen Iverson, Rasheed Wallace, and Latrell Sprewell.  Many female mixed martial artists who have more than jaw-length hair choose to wear cornrows for their fights as it prevents their hair from obscuring their vision as they move.

Controversy

Over the decades, cornrows, alongside dreadlocks, have been the subject of several disputes in U.S. workplaces, as well as universities. Some employers and educational institutions have considered them unsuitable and banned them. Employees and civil rights groups have countered that such attitudes evidence cultural bias, and some disputes have resulted in litigation.

In 2011, the High Court of the United Kingdom, in a decision reported as a test case, ruled against a school's decision to refuse entry to a student with cornrows. The school claimed this was part of its policy mandating "short back and sides" haircuts, and banning styles that might be worn as indicators of gang membership. However, the court ruled that the student was expressing a tradition and that such policies, while possibly justifiable in certain cases (e.g. skinhead gangs), had to accommodate reasonable racial diversities and cultural practices.

In the US state of California, the CROWN Act was passed in 2019 to prohibit discrimination based on hair style and hair texture.

Gallery

See also
List of hairstyles
Crochet braids
French braid
Waves (hairstyle)
Box braids

References

External links
 
 

1970s fashion
1980s fashion
1990s fashion
2000s fashion
2010s fashion
2020s fashion
Braid hairstyles